In mathematics, particularly topology, the tube lemma is a useful tool in order to prove that the finite product of compact spaces is compact.

Statement 

The lemma uses the following terminology:

Using the concept of closed maps, this can be rephrased concisely as follows: if  is any topological space and  a compact space, then the projection map  is closed.

Examples and properties 

1. Consider  in the product topology, that is the Euclidean plane, and the open set   The open set  contains  but contains no tube, so in this case the tube lemma fails. This shows that the compactness assumption is essential.

2.

Call the union of these finitely many elements  
By the tube lemma, there is an open set of the form  containing  and contained in  

3. By part 2 and induction, one can show that the finite product of compact spaces is compact.

4. The tube lemma cannot be used to prove the Tychonoff theorem, which generalizes the above to infinite products.

Proof 

The tube lemma follows from the generalized tube lemma by taking  and  
It therefore suffices to prove the generalized tube lemma. 
By the definition of the product topology, for each  there are open sets  and  such that  
For any   is an open cover of the compact set  so this cover has a finite subcover; namely, there is a finite set  such that  contains  where observe that  is open in  
For every  let  which is an open in  set since  is finite. 
We now essentially repeat the argument to drop the dependence on 
Let  be a finite subset such that  contains  and set  

See also

References 

 
  (See Chapter 8, Lemma 8.9)

Topology
Lemmas
Articles containing proofs